Butch Patterson: Private Dick is a Canadian serial comedy television series centering on the seedy exploits of a self-described premature ejaculating, alcoholic, kleptomaniac, sexually deviant private detective played by Canadian actor/comedian Greg Lawrence. The series had a three season run, airing on The Comedy Network. Although the show was not a critical or commercial success, it maintains a small cult following. After the series' initial run, reruns were featured on the now defunct CBC Country Canada. Since then, all three original seasons have been released on DVD.

Style
Most of the episodes are focused around the cases that Butch Patterson is investigating at the time. Unlike most comedy series, Butch Patterson has a contiguous plot line running throughout the entire three seasons. The show is shot in a drab hue that provides a film noir feel. Much of the humour is derived from the candid narrative of Butch as he reflects on his cases and his general state of affairs. There is a heavy reliance on recurring jokes about Butch's seemingly irrational disdain for bartenders and tailors, his chagrin regarding his childhood bullies and his brassy, open references to his sexual dysfunction.  Other gags involve his near unquenchable craving for alcohol and cheap cigars, as well as his tendency towards kleptomania.

Music
The show features a short jazz theme song that plays during the opening and ending credits [more info needed]. The score featured throughout much of each episode synchronizes emphatically with the tone of each scene, adding greatly to the comic impression upon the viewer.

Characters
Butch Patterson (Greg Lawrence) - A hard-bitten private detective who suffers from alcoholism, kleptomania, a tendency to prematurely ejaculate, chronic urinary problems that cause him to continually wet his pants, and a tendency to shoot himself while cleaning his gun.  Butch enjoys prostitutes, pornography, cigars, any and every kind of alcoholic drink, and making crank calls to a man named Frank.  He hates tailors, has a disturbing predilection for trying on lingerie, and is still trying (and failing) to live down a certain incident at a local petting zoo.  Butch also has an unfortunate tendency to misplace his pants, and to wake up in strange places after having too much to drink. He is also banned from the local petting zoo.

Blanche DuMaurier (Vivian Burns) - A virtuous, hardworking newspaper reporter, Blanche is generally disgusted by Butch's deviant tendencies, but often assists him with his various problems, most notably bailing him out of jail on multiple occasions.  She is a staunch foe of Tommy Rubella's criminal empire, and strives to bring him down with the help of Butch and the Swede.

Tommy Rubella (David L. McCallum) - The crime lord and kingpin of the city where Butch Patterson lives and operates.  Despite seeming like an imposing figure, he is intimidated by domineering women, including Debbie Hitler and Jasmine Griffin, fearing them for very good reason.  He is a talented accordion player, and has a tattoo of Buddy Ebsen on his back, something which his wife hates.

Debbie Hitler (Susan Brooks) - Tommy Rubella's power-hungry wife, who possesses an extremely violent temper and a strange fetish for deck wood.  Known for beating, maiming and killing people for even the slightest offence, she terrifies even Tommy and the Swede.

"The Swede" aka Serge Lacroix (John Ng) - A contract killer who ostensibly works for Tommy and Debbie as an assassin, but he serves as a double agent, frequently double-crossing his employers and working with Blanche in her investigations of Tommy and Debbie.  Killing is his favorite pastime, although he is a consummate company man, only doing so when his employer gives the order.  Butch insists that the Swede is French, a claim that is later proven true when it is revealed that the Swede is an undercover French Canadian police agent.

Vance Van Vandervan (David Elver) - The crooked curator of the Scott Baio Museum of Fine Art, Vance is involved in the dirty dealings of Debbie, Tommy and Jasmine, constantly playing each side against the other as he tries to further his own agenda.  He greatly enjoys roast chicken, and has an unfortunate tendency to wet his bed.

Jasmine Griffen (Sarah Van Diepen) - The ex-lover of both Tommy and Vance.  Now a conniving, manipulative seductress, Jasmine attempts to manipulate Tommy, Vance and Butch for her own purposes.  In her youth, she travelled through Finland as a circus performer after overcoming an addiction to crystal meth.

Episodes

Season 1 (1999)

Season 2 (2000)

Season 3 (2000–01)

External links

Fansite (no longer updated)
Butch Patterson DVDs (Other titles from Ocnus Productions as well)

1999 Canadian television series debuts
2001 Canadian television series endings
CTV Comedy Channel original programming
Television shows filmed in Ottawa
1990s Canadian sitcoms
2000s Canadian sitcoms